Michael Leavitt may refer to:

Mike Leavitt (born 1951), American politician
Michael B. Leavitt (1843–1935), American theater entrepreneur, manager, and producer
Michael P. Leavitt (born 1960), Master Chief Petty Officer of the Coast Guard
Michael Leavitt (artist) (born 1977), American visual artist

See also
Michael Levitt (born 1947), American-British-Israeli biophysicist
Michael Levitt (producer) (born 1968), American television producer
Michael Levitt (politician), Canadian  member of parliament for York Centre